Triplophysa hialmari is a species of stone loach endemic to China. Its type locality is "Ba-tshu River", a tributary of the Yangtze River near Yushu City, Qinghai.

References

hialmari
Freshwater fish of China
Endemic fauna of China
Taxa named by Artem Mikhailovich Prokofiev
Fish described in 2001